Baigorria may refer to: 
Manuel Baigorria
Juan Bautista Baigorria
Granadero Baigorria